Serviam is Latin for "I will serve."  This was the cry of St. Michael the Archangel as a response to Lucifer's "I will not serve" (Non serviam) when God put the angels to the test.

In Catholicism  
Bishop Gerard L. Frey, who once headed the dioceses of Savannah, Ga., and Lafayette used it as his motto. 

It is also recommended as a morning prayer or morning offering.

References

Latin religious words and phrases